Bach: Unaccompanied Cello Suites Performed on Double Bass is an album released by the double bass virtuoso Edgar Meyer. Meyer plays three of JS Bach's Cello Suites BWV 1007-1012. Performing cello suites on a double bass offers intriguing challenges. Meyer recorded Suites I, II and V. There also are recordings of all six Suites by Richard Hartshorne (on Centaur), Gerd Reinke (on rclcds) and François_Rabbath (on Solstice). Gary Karr recorded Suites IV, V and VI (on Lemur Music).

Discography

Suite for Solo Cello No. 2 in D Minor, BWV 1008
Prelude - 4:05
Allemande - 3:47
Courante - 2:09
Sarabande - 4:24
Menuette 1 & 2 - 3:15
Gigue - 2:43
Suite for Solo Cello No. 1 in G Major, BWV 1007
Prelude - 2:28
Allemande - 4:28
Courante - 2:12
Sarabande - 2:30
Menuette 1 & 2 - 4:01
Gigue - 1:39
Suite for Solo Cello No. 5 in C Minor, BWV 1011
Prelude - 5:49
Allemande - 5:01
Courante - 2:10
Sarabande - 3:55
Gavotte 1 & 2 - 4:17
Gigue - 2:10

References

Edgar Meyer albums
2000 classical albums